Michael Begley is a British television and theatre actor and writer.

Begley has written two stage plays: Martha Loves Michael, which was co-written with Sally Abbott, and The Guys. He wrote the television series Cowboys and Indians with Abbott and Jon Sen, and has written several episodes of EastEnders. He won Best Newcomer at the Manchester Evening News Theatre Awards in 1996 for his roles in The Tempest, Wildest Dreams and Life of Galileo, and was nominated in the TMA Awards for Best Supporting Actor in 2002. His television and film acting roles include Vacuuming Completely Nude in Paradise, Bob & Rose, City Central, William and Mary, Being Human, and most recently, an episode of EastEnders, which he also wrote.

Filmography

References

Living people
Year of birth missing (living people)
British male television actors
British male stage actors
British television writers
British male television writers